British Columbia wine is Canadian wine produced in the province of British Columbia. Wines made from 100% British Columbia grapes can qualify for classification under one of British Columbia's two classification systems, depending on the variety, the winemaking techniques employed, and various other restrictions.

Originally, the British Columbia Wine Institute handled regulation and marketing of the Vintners Quality Alliance (VQA), which is also an appellation system.  More recently, the British Columbia Wine Authority was formed by the provincial government to regulate part of the industry.   It created a second classification, "Wines of Distinction", to be also from 100 percent British Columbia grapes, but with less stringent quality control.  In practice, it has strengthened the VQA classification.

Wines which are neither labelled VQA or Wine of Distinction, and from certain producers (given special rights under the 1988 Canada-United States Free Trade Agreement), can use foreign bulk wine to produce a third category of wine which is labelled as Cellared in Canada. Significant parts of the wine industry, and respected wine writers in Canada and abroad, are quite concerned about this practice.

There are several classifications of winery, represented by numerous organizations.  The smallest are known as "farmgate" wineries.  "Land" wineries are mid-sized operations.

Climate 

Although Canada has a reputation for having a cold climate, much of the British Columbia Interior has a mild or dry climate which is ideal for growing grapes.  Within the Interior, the Okanagan Valley in particular is known for both the high quality of its wines, and for its increasing number of respected wineries, smaller pockets such as the Creston Valley have been emerging of late, with very high quality first epoch vitis vinifera varietals.  On the Coast, the Cowichan Valley and Saanich Peninsula on Vancouver Island, the Gulf Islands, and the Fraser Valley in the Lower Mainland are also wine-growing regions. Experimentation with vines has also happened in various other southerly areas of the province.

Varieties 

The most prominent varieties of grapes grown in British Columbia are:

For red wine and rosé production:

 Merlot
 Pinot noir
 Cabernet Sauvignon
 Syrah (Shiraz)
 Cabernet Franc
 Gamay
 Marechal Foch
 Malbec
 Petit Verdot
 Zweigelt

For white wines:

 Pinot gris
 Chardonnay
 Gewürztraminer
 Sauvignon blanc
 Pinot blanc
 Riesling
 Viognier
 Ehrenfelser
 Semillon
 Bacchus

Growing regions 

Based on their unique terroir, there are five official viticultural areas in the province which are recognized by the VQA.  Wines bearing the name of a viticultural area are produced from a minimum of 95 percent of the grapes grown in the designated area.

 Okanagan Valley
 Similkameen Valley
 Fraser Valley
 Vancouver Island (including Cowichan Valley and Saanich Peninsula)
 Gulf Islands

There are also emerging regions:
 Kootenay
 Thompson/Shuswap
 Lillooet

Association of BC Winegrowers
The Association of British Columbia Winegrowers (ABCW) is an association of winemakers located in British Columbia. Most of the member wineries are small lot producers (less than 5,000 cases produced each year), family-owned and -operated. Their wines are all made from 100% BC-grown fruit. The ABCW's 57 members account for over 70% of the province's wineries.

See also
 Blasted Church Vineyards
 Blue Mountain Vineyard
 Cool Climate Oenology and Viticulture Institute
 Ice wine
 Jackson-Triggs
 Ontario wine
 Nova Scotia wine
 Quebec wine
 Quails' Gate Winery

References

External links
 Association of B.C. Winegrowers
 British Columbia Estate Winery Association
 Interactive BC wine map
 Wines of British Columbia

Canadian wine
Wine regions of British Columbia
Alcohol in British Columbia
Canadian cuisine
Canadian drinks
Canadian alcoholic drinks